Anne Marie Ottersen Lindtner (born 29 April 1945) is a Norwegian actress. She has been working at Nationaltheatret (the National Theatre) since 1970, and acted in roles such as "Polly Peachum" in Bertolt Brecht's The Threepenny Opera, and "Martha" in Edward Albees Who's Afraid of Virginia Woolf?.

Ottersen is well known from various roles on film and television. Among her roles is "Mie" from the Hustruer-trilogy, and she won an Amanda – the main Norwegian film award – for best actress for her role in Hustruer - ti år etter in 1986. She has also acted in TV series, such as Fredrikssons fabrikk, Bot og bedring, and Holms.

Ottesen lives in Oslo, and has been married to the actor Lasse Lindtner since 1990. Together they have one daughter, and Ottersen also has two sons from a previous relationship. She is also an eager and lifelong fan of speed skating.

Select filmography
 1969: Taxi - Nattsvermere
 1969: Psychedelica Blues
 1974: Kimen
 1975: Hustruer
 1980: Nedtur
 1984: On the Threshold
 1985: Deilig er fjorden!
 1985: Hustruer - ti år etter
 1986: Drømmeslottet
 1986: Plastposen
 1989: Bryllupsfesten
 1990: Fredrikssons fabrikk (TV)
 1996: Hustruer III
 1998: Bot og bedring (TV)
 2002: Holms (TV)
 2005: Import-eksport

References

External links

Biography from Nationaltheateret.
Interview from Dagbladet.

1945 births
Living people
Norwegian stage actresses
Norwegian film actresses
Norwegian television actresses
Place of birth missing (living people)